G49 or G.49 may refer to :
 Fiat G.49, a 1952 Italian two-seat basic trainer aircraft
 HMAS Norman (G49), a 1940 Royal Australian Navy N class destroyer